Niphargopsis may refer to:
 Niphargopsis, a genus of amphipods in the family Niphargidae, synonym of Niphargus
 Niphargopsis, a genus of amphipods in the family Austroniphargidae, synonym of Austroniphargus